The Irish Book Awards are Irish literary awards given annually to books and authors in various categories. In 2018 An Post took over sponsorship of the awards from Bord Gais Energy. It is the only literary award supported by all-Irish bookstores. First awarded in 2006, they grew out of the Hughes & Hughes bookstore's Irish Novel of the Year Prize which was inaugurated in 2003. Since 2007 the Awards have been an independent not-for-profit company funded by sponsorship. The primary sponsor is An Post, the state owned postal service in Ireland. There are currently nine categories, seven of which are judged by the Irish Literary Academy, two by a public vote. There is also a lifetime achievement award.

Awards

Current Awards 
Novel of the Year
Crime Fiction Book of the Year
Best Irish Published Book of the Year
Non-Fiction Book of the Year
Cookbook of the Year
Popular Fiction Book of the Year
Children's Book of the Year, Junior 
Children's Book of the Year, Senior
Teen & Young Adult Book of the Year
Sports Book of the Year
Newcomer of the Year
Irish Language Book of the Year 
Lifestyle Book of the Year
Biography of the Year
Author of the Year
Short Story of the Year
Poem of  the Year
Bookshop of the Year
Lifetime Achievement Award

Previous Awards 

 International Recognition Award (last awarded 2020)
 RTÉ Audience/Listeners' Choice Award (last awarded 2021)
 Popular Non-Fiction Book of the Year (last awarded 2020)

An Post Irish Book of the Year 
Since 2011, one of the award winning books has been selected as the overall Irish Book of the Year.

Winners
Book of the Year winners are indicated with a blue ribbon.

2003–2005 (Hughes & Hughes Award / Irish Novel) 
Inaugurated in 2000 by Hughes & Hughes, the Hughes & Hughes Award ran until 2005 when it merged with the Irish Book Awards and became the Irish Novel category.
2003: That They May Face the Rising Sun by John McGahern
2004: Dancer by Colum McCann
2005: Havoc in its Third Year by Ronan Bennett

2006

In subsequent years the Children's Book category was split in to two award categories; Junior and Senior.

2007

2008

2009

2010

2011

2012

2013

2014
The 2014 awards were presented on 26 November at the DoubleTree by Hilton Hotel in Dublin.

2015
The 2015 awards were presented on 25 November at the DoubleTree by Hilton Hotel in Dublin.

2016
The 2016 awards sponsored by Bord Gáis Energy were presented on 16 November at the DoubleTree by Hilton Hotel in Dublin. The awards ceremony was presented by Keelin Shanley.

On 14 December, Solar Bones by Mike McCormack was named as Ireland's best book of 2016. It was chosen by a public vote from the list of category winners below.

2017
The 2017 awards sponsored by Bord Gáis Energy were presented on 28 November at the Clayton Hotel in Dublin. The awards ceremony was presented by  RTÉ's Keelin Shanley and Evelyn O’ Rourke.

2018
The 2018 awards sponsored by An Post were presented on 27 November at the Clayton Hotel in Dublin. The awards ceremony was presented by RTÉ's Keelin Shanley while each winning author was interviewed Evelyn O'Rourke.

Notes to Self by Emilie Pine was voted the An Post Irish Book of the Year for 2018.

2019
The 2019 awards ceremony was held in Dublin on 20 November 2019. The event was hosted by Miriam O'Callaghan and Evelyn O'Rourke. Over 115,000 votes were cast by readers to select the winners in each category. 

The winner of the An Post Irish Book of the Year was Overcoming by Vicky Phelan and Naomi Linehan.

2020
The 2020 awards ceremony was held virtually on 25 November 2020. A record number of votes were cast by the Irish public to select the winners in each category. 

A Ghost in the Throat by Doireann Ní Ghríofa was announced as Irish Book of the Year in December 2020.

2021 
The awards ceremony was broadcast online on 23 November 2021.

On 8 December, We Don't Know Ourselves: A Personal History of Ireland Since 1958 was announced as Irish Book of the Year during a one-hour television special on RTÉ One.

2022 
The awards ceremony was broadcast online on 25 November 2021.

On 7 December, My Fourth Time, We Drowned was announced as Irish Book of the Year during a one-hour television special on RTÉ One.

References

External links

Irish Book Awards

Awards established in 2006
Irish literary awards
Fiction awards
Non-fiction literary awards
Irish children's literary awards
Literary awards honoring lifetime achievement
Sports writing awards
Mystery and detective fiction awards
First book awards